Ivan Đurković (born 20 February 1986) is a Montenegrin handball player.

Career
Đurković spent two and a half seasons at Partizan, before moving to Croatia and signing with Varteks in January 2008. He would play for fellow Croatian club Metković in the 2011–12 season.

Honours
Partizan
 Serbian Handball Cup: 2006–07

References

External links
 

1986 births
Living people
People from Berane
Montenegrin male handball players
RK Partizan players
Expatriate handball players
Montenegrin expatriate sportspeople in Serbia
Montenegrin expatriate sportspeople in Croatia